Windsor Park Stud is a New Zealand thoroughbred stud farm that was established in 1998 near Cambridge, in the Waikato region of the North Island.

Windsor Park was established by Ian and Jesse Duncan.  In 1971 it passed ownership to Nelson and Sue Schick and their son Rodney. The operation now occupies around 1,300 acres across three sites.

Windsor Park Stud has sponsored the Windsor Park Plate one of the Hawkes Bay triple crown races held in September.

Stallions

It has had a number of top quality stallions including:

Progeny

Progeny from Windsor Park include:

 Beauty Flash, Hong Kong G1 winner. 
 Gold Onyx, winner at G1 level in South Africa.
 Might And Power, dual Australian horse of the year, winner of the 1997 Caulfield Cup & Melbourne Cup, 1998 Cox Plate.
 Monaco Consol, 2009 Victoria Derby winner. 
 Military Move, 2010 New Zealand Derby winner.
 So You Think, Winner of the 2009 & 2010 Cox Plate, 2011 Irish Champion Stakes.

See also

 Thoroughbred racing in New Zealand
 Cambridge Stud
 Trelawney Stud

References

External links
Windsor Park Stud

Horse farms
Farms in New Zealand
Horse racing in New Zealand
Buildings and structures in Waikato
Cambridge, New Zealand